Poproč can refer to:

Poproč, a village in the Košice Region (Košice–okolie District) of Slovakia
Poproč, a village in the Banská Bystrica Region (Rimavská Sobota District) of Slovakia